László Fábián (10 July 1936 in Budapest – 10 August 2018) was a Hungarian sprint canoeist who competed from the late 1950s to the late 1960s. He won a gold medal in the K-2 10000 m  at the 1956 Summer Olympics in Melbourne.  He was Jewish.

Fábián also won five medals at the ICF Canoe Sprint World Championships with four golds (K-2 10000 m: 1958, 1963, 1966; K-4 10000 m: 1963) and one silver (K-4 10000 m: 1966).

See also
 List of select Jewish canoeists

References

External links
 
 
 

1936 births
2018 deaths
Canoeists from Budapest
Jewish Hungarian sportspeople
Canoeists at the 1956 Summer Olympics
Hungarian male canoeists
Olympic canoeists of Hungary
Olympic gold medalists for Hungary
Olympic medalists in canoeing
ICF Canoe Sprint World Championships medalists in kayak
Medalists at the 1956 Summer Olympics
20th-century Hungarian people